Tarping is a term referring to a common Anglican practice of performing the ablutions at the point indicated by the majority of Western rites, that is to say immediately after the distribution of Holy Communion rather than after the service as was prescribed in the 1662 Book of Common Prayer.  The term is derived from the initial letters of "Taking the Ablutions at the Right Place".

"The Bishop of Southwell in 1922 had refused as a Visitor to intervene over 'tarping'; ... Anglo-Catholic parishes, and even more, non-parochial chapels of religious orders, were a law unto themselves." - Alastair Mason, History of the Society of the Sacred Mission, Canterbury Press, 1993

Order of Mass